The 3rd Municipal Sportshall of Ano Liosia, also known as Zofria Indoor Hall (Greek: Κλειστό Ζωφριάς), is an indoor sporting arena that is located in the Zofria district of Ano Liosia, Athens, Greece. The arena can be used to host volleyball and basketball games. The capacity of the arena for basketball games is 3,000, with 1,300 permanent seats.

History
The arena hosted the 2000 CEV Cup Final Four. The Greek League club AEK Athens has also used the arena to host home games.

References

External links
Information on the arena @ Stadia.gr

Basketball venues in Greece
Fyli
Indoor arenas in Greece
Sports venues in Attica
Volleyball venues in Greece